Henrik Werth (26 December 1881 – 28 May 1952) was a Hungarian military officer, who served as Chief of Army Staff during World War II.

Biography
Henrik Werth was born in Rezsőháza, Hungary (Knićanin, today in Serbia), on 26 December 1881. He became a military cadet in the Austro-Hungarian Army in 1897 in Vienna, and got a rapid advance in rank during World War I. By 1918, he was a lieutenant colonel. He later served the Hungarian Soviet Republic after the collapse of Austria-Hungary as the commander of the Hungarian Red Army's I Army Corps before being given command of the 7th Infantry Division. 

Werth continued serving after the fall of the communist regime, being promoted to colonel in 1920, and to major general in 1926. He taught at the general staff academy and briefly served as the chief of operations on the general staff during that time. Werth was given mandatory retirement at age of 55, which he reached in 1936. However, he was recalled up into service in 1938 and became the chief of general staff. 

Of German ancestry, he supported Hungary's entry into World War II and believed that Hungary could profit from helping the Germans. He was later dismissed from his post because of making a promise to the Germans that all Hungarian Army units would be available to them (without the permission of Regent Miklós Horthy).

He was recalled from retirement in February 1945 by the Soviet forces, and was immediately arrested. The Hungarian People's Court sentenced him to death because of war crimes. He was transferred to the USSR where he died in 1952.

References

Sources
 Profile (search "W" for Werth), Magyar Életrajzi Lexikon; accessed 24 January 2018.

1881 births
1952 deaths
Hungarian people of German descent
Military personnel from Zrenjanin
Hungarian soldiers
Austro-Hungarian military personnel of World War I
Austro-Hungarian Army officers
Hungarian military personnel of World War II